Vivian Kwang-wen Lin is Executive Associate Dean and Professor of Public Health Practice in the Li Ka Shing Faculty of Medicine at the University of Hong Kong.

Early life and education 
Lin earned her bachelor's degree at Yale University in 1977. She moved to the University of California, Berkeley for her graduate studies, first earning a master's degree in public health (1979) and subsequently a doctorate (1986).

Research and career 
Lin moved to Australia in 1982, joining the Victorian Health Department. In 1997 she was appointed Executive Officer of the National Public Health Partnership. The NPHP looked to develop a strategic response to public health challenges in Australia. It covered topics including Aboriginal health, communicable diseases, mental health and healthy ageing.

In 2000 Lin was appointed Chair of Public Health at La Trobe University in Melbourne. There she worked on Australian public health policy. She moved to the World Health Organization in 2013, where she was made Director of Health Systems in the Western Pacific Regional Office. At the WHO Lin worked on programmes including universal health coverage, gender-based violence, health law and community engagement. Working with the Australian government, Lin created an Australian health sector aid strategy for China.

In 2019 Lin joined the Li Ka Shing Faculty of Medicine at the University of Hong Kong. During the COVID-19 pandemic, Lin was appointed to the Paris Institute for Advanced Study World Pandemic Research Network (WPRN). The WPRN looked to understand the impact of coronavirus disease on the social sciences and humanities.

Lin serves on the editorial board of the Journal of Hospital Management & Health Policy.

Selected publications

Books

References 

Living people
Year of birth missing (living people)
University of California, Berkeley alumni
Academic staff of the University of Hong Kong
Public health researchers